Palaram is a village and a Gram panchayat of Ananthagiri mandal, Suryapet district, in Telangana state.

References

Villages in Suryapet district